Uroš Golubović (born 19 August 1976) is a Serbian former professional footballer who played as a goalkeeper.

Career
In the 1995–96 season, Golubović was a regular member of IMR in the Serbian League Belgrade. He subsequently played for Rad in the First League of FR Yugoslavia until the end of the 2001–02 season. Afterwards, Golubović moved to Bosnia and Herzegovina and signed with Leotar, helping the club win the national championship in the 2002–03 season.

In the summer of 2003, Golubović moved to Bulgaria and joined Spartak Varna. He played regularly for the side that season, before switching to fellow Bulgarian club Lokomotiv Sofia in the summer of 2004. Over the next four seasons, Golubović amassed over 100 league appearances and helped the side qualify for the UEFA Cup twice in a row (2006–07 and 2007–08). He subsequently spent three years at Litex Lovech, winning two consecutive championships (2009–10 and 2010–11), one Bulgarian Cup, and one Bulgarian Supercup. In the summer of 2011, Golubović signed for newly promoted Ludogorets Razgrad. He spent two seasons at the club, winning the league on both occasions and adding one more Cup (2011–12) and Supercup (2012) to his collection.

Honours
Leotar
 Premier League of Bosnia and Herzegovina: 2002–03
Litex Lovech
 Bulgarian First League: 2009–10, 2010–11
 Bulgarian Cup: 2008–09
 Bulgarian Supercup: 2010
Ludogorets Razgrad
 Bulgarian First League: 2011–12, 2012–13
 Bulgarian Cup: 2011–12
 Bulgarian Supercup: 2012

External links

 
 
 
 

Association football goalkeepers
First Professional Football League (Bulgaria) players
Expatriate footballers in Bosnia and Herzegovina
Expatriate footballers in Bulgaria
FC Lokomotiv 1929 Sofia players
First League of Serbia and Montenegro players
FK Leotar players
FK Rad players
Footballers from Belgrade
PFC Litex Lovech players
PFC Ludogorets Razgrad players
PFC Spartak Varna players
Premier League of Bosnia and Herzegovina players
Serbia and Montenegro expatriate footballers
Serbia and Montenegro expatriate sportspeople in Bosnia and Herzegovina
Serbia and Montenegro expatriate sportspeople in Bulgaria
Serbia and Montenegro footballers
Serbian expatriate footballers
Serbian expatriate sportspeople in Bulgaria
Serbian footballers
1976 births
Living people